St. Benedict at Auburndale High School is a diocesan, co-educational, college preparatory school committed to academic excellence through a comprehensive and challenging multi-level curriculum presented in an atmosphere permeated with the aims, values and teachings of the Roman Catholic faith. The school teaches grades 9–12 in Cordova, Tennessee. 

The school colors are red and blue, the mascot is the Eagle, and the school is located on a forty-seven-acre campus.

History

The Auburndale School was founded in 1966 by Mrs. Mary Alice Riggs Smith. The first Auburndale senior class graduated in 1976. On January 14, 1988, Bishop Buechlein announced the Catholic Diocese of Memphis had purchased the Auburndale School. Plans, terms, and even a name, St. Benedict at Auburndale, named after the patron saint of Bishop Buechlein’s order, were agreed upon. The diocese reached out to The Dominican Sisters of St. Cecilia in Nashville to come to SBA and enlighten it with a solid spiritual and religious presence. As the demand for a quality Catholic high school education grew, SBA received more applications than they could admit. In July 2004, after several years of discussion, fund-raising, and construction, SBA moved next door to the new campus and underwent a transition into a high school-only setting, serving grades 9 through 12.

St. Benedict at Auburndale is accredited by the Southern Association of Colleges and Schools. St. Benedict is a member of the National Catholic Education Association, an associate member of the Memphis Association of Independent Schools, a member of the National Association of Supervision and Curriculum Development, Learning Disabilities Association, National Association of Secondary School Principals, and Tennessee Secondary School Athletic Association.

Academics & College Prep

Athletics
St. Benedict retains membership in and abides by the constitutions, by-laws and regulations of the Tennessee Secondary School Athletic Association (TSSAA)."

Bowling
With a multitude of state championships, the SBA bowling team is the winningest in the state. The boys currently have four state champion titles and the girls have seven. In 2017, the Eagles won their second consecutive state championship against Christian Brothers.

Arts

Spirituality & Service

School Policies 
Saint Benedict at Auburndale (SBA) drugs tests every student at least once a year with a sample of a students hair. The following is from the Saint Benedict at Auburndale Student Handbook:
"We are not immune. Our school is not and our students are not. And all that's out there in the world scares us more than we’d like to admit. We at St. Benedict at Auburndale are participating in this drug testing program for one PRIMARY purpose … to provide our students with yet one more reason they can draw upon when faced with choosing for or against drugs. Some are able to make that choice on their own without any fear at all of social pressure or peer ramifications. But some are not. And we hope that this program will ease their decision-making."

Notable alumni
 Chris Hardwick - actor, Internet personality
 Jordan Wilkins - Running Back for NFL's Indianapolis Colts

References

1966 establishments in Tennessee
Educational institutions established in 1966
Roman Catholic Diocese of Memphis
Catholic secondary schools in Tennessee
Schools in Shelby County, Tennessee